Eurycephalosuchus is an extinct genus of orientalosuchine alligatoroid from the Late Cretaceous Jiangxi Province of China. Known from a well preserved skull and mandible alongside various postcranial remains, Eurycephalosuchus possessed a short and broad skull with a very short skulltable. Eurycephalosuchus lived with at least one other crocodilian, an indetermined member of the clade Brevirostres. The genus is monotypic, containing only the species Eurycephalosuchus gannanensis.

History and naming
The sediments the fossils were found in belong to the redbeds, which in this area are a part of the Late Cretaceous Hekou Formation, possibly correlating with the Maastrichtian age. The block contained a nearly complete skull with the attached mandible, 14 vertebrae after the axis, 15 ribs, a partial front limb and several osteoderms, all of which together are designated as specimen IVPP V 31110, which forms the holotype of the genus. There is some compression that affected the skull during preservation, pushing parts of the frontal and prefrontal bones over the rear edge of the nasal bone. The same locality also yielded a shoulder blade articulated with a coracoid which are thought to belong to another type of crocodile, only described as being a member of Brevirostres and notably bigger than Eurycephalosuchus.

The name Eurycephalosuchus is a composite word of the Greek "eurys" meaning wide or broad, "kephalos" meaning head and -suchus, derived from the Egyptian crocodile god Sobek. The species name on the other hand specifically points to Gannan, another name for Ganzhou, where the material was collected.

Description
Eurycephalosuchus was a small to medium sized alligatoroid with an incredibly broad and short head, almost as wide as it is long. The fossil skull itself measures  in dorsal cranial length, meaning measured from the tip of the snout to the rear end of the skulltable. Accounting for the slight compression the fossil underwent, a fully intact skull would likely measure , which is approximately the same as the maximum with across the quadratojugals. Measuring from the tip to the snout to the end of the quadrate condyle would render a skull only slightly longer than wide. Other parts of the skull likewise show bizarre proportions. The skulltable, which is typically shorter than it is wide in crocodilians, takes this condition to an extreme. The length of this element is two thirds smaller than its width.

The external nares are damaged towards the front, meaning that it is uncertain whether or not they form a singular confluent opening or not. Assuming a condition similar to Orientalosuchus, a confluent opening would be wider than long. The eyesockets were heavily distorted, but are clearly bigger than the triangular supratemporal fenestra. Like the overall proportions of the skull, the supratemporals too are wider than long. The bones that form the edge of the fenestra, sans the frontal bone, overhang the opening which differs from what is observed in any other member of Orientalosuchina that preserves this region of the skull.

As in many crocodilians, Eurycephalosuchus has a notable notch located at the border of the premaxilla and maxilla that receives the enlarged fourth dentary tooth. This notch is moderately deep similar to Orientalosuchus and Leidyosuchus, differing from the shallow notch of Jiangxisuchus and Dongnanosuchus. The nasal bones are paired and unfused and form a narrow point that extends into the external nares. The posterior end of these bones may have tapered following contact with the lacrimals, but the overlap caused by taphonomy makes it impossible to tell based on the fossil. The maxillae are broad and long, ending in a wedge shaped process towards the front of the skull. When viewed from above the outer edges of the maxilla are sinuous, constricting at the contact with the premaxilla, broadening around the large 5th maxillary tooth before constricting and broadening once again shortly behind it. This is also reflected in sideview, with the tooth row showing two clear festoons, which peak with the 5th and 12th maxillary teeth respectively. The lacrimal bone is pointed towards the front, wedging itself into the maxilla, and broad towards the back, where the bone forms a process that contributes significantly towards the anterior margin of the orbits. The prefrontal bones are triangular based on the better preserved left side, the frontal bone contributes little to the orbital margins, but forms a moderately broad band between the eyes, broader than between the supratemporal fenestrae. The postorbital is almost rectangular with a slight point towards the front. The single parietal has almost straight contacts with the squamosals and a concave suture with the supraoccipital, which is exposed in dorsal view. The jugal bone is triradiate with a broad but short anterior ramus and a thinner but longer posterior ramus. The jugal contributes to the margins of the orbits and makes up the majority of the margin of the infratemporal fenestra. The quadratojugal bears a short spine that runs almost parallel to the rear edge of the infratemporal, resembling other alligatoroids like Brachychampsa but differing from all other orientalosuchines.

The mandible shows a great increase in depth towards the back of the skull, starting off relatively shallow with a depth of only  at the position of the fourth dentary tooth before increasing to a depth of  around the mandibular fenestra. This means that the mandible increases in depth by over three times the number measured at the shallowest point. The dentary bone reaches its greatest breadth at the position of the 6th dentary tooth and the symphysis extends up to the 6th. The surangular bone interlocks with the dentary towards, forming two processes of nearly equal length. The surrangular thickens towards the back before tapering again as it contributes to the retroarticular process, almost reaching its end. The angular bone also reaches its greatest depth around the mandibular fenestra, tapering and underlying the dentary towards the front and tapering into the retroarticular process towards the back. When viewed from above the retroarticular process is roughly triangular with a ball-shaped end. Its surface is concave and bears a broad prominence that is however weakly developed.

The premaxilla bears five teeth, the 3rd and 4th of which notably larger than the rest. Fourteen teeth sit in each maxilla, starting with a minute first tooth and rapidly increasing in length, reaching the maximum with a large caniniform 5th maxillary tooth. The following three teeth are all smaller than this caniniform and starting with the 8th these teeth are necked. They again show an increase in size, though not as rapidly and with as extreme results as the size increase leading up to the 5th tooth. These later teeth have bulb-shaped crowns with almost circular crosssections. The dentary toothrow is largely obscured by the teeth of the upper jaw, meaning the total number of teeth is unknown. As common in crocodilians, there is an enlarged 4th dentary tooth that slips into the notch present between the premaxilla and maxilla. Another large tooth is present further back, identified as the 12th dentary tooth based on Jiangxisuchus. It slides in-between the 7th and 8th maxillary tooth. At least five more teeth sit behind this tooth, their bases visible beneath the overlying maxillary teeth. They seem to resemble their opposing teeth in size and shape.

Based on skull length alone, Eurycephalosuchus may have been the smallest orientalosuchine, slightly shorter than Krabisuchus and with a narrower occiput than Eoalligator.

Phylogeny
For the phylogenetic analysis the data matrix of Shan et al. (2021) was employed, specifically the first of the two employed by Shan et al. due to the inclusion of more terminal taxa. The strict consensus tree recovered agreed with the prior conclusion that Orientalosuchina had a basal position within Globidonta. Even with Eurycephalosuchus included, Orientalosuchina was recovered as a monophyletic group. The genus clades with three other orientalosuchines from China and one from Vietnam, taking a sister relationship to the clade containing Jiangxisuchus and Eoalligator. This relationship seems to match the distribution of the three taxa, all of them being known from the Late Cretaceous of China.

Paleobiology
The red beds where Eurycephalosuchus was found also preserve the fossils of a great variety of other reptiles including lizards, turtles and dinosaurs. A large bodied crocodilian only assigned to the clade Brevirostres was found and described alongside Eurycephalosuchus. Given the proximaty between the two and similar preservation, they may have coexisted during the earliest Maastrichtian. This would not be out of the usual, as different crocodilian species are known to coexist both in the fossil record and in the modern day. Behavior, ecology, habitat preferences and tolerances may have all been factors that allowed the two to co-occur. Although the absence of skull material for the larger brevirostrine makes it impossible to determine its ecology, the greater size might indicate that it was the more dominant of the two species.

References

Cretaceous crocodylomorphs
Cretaceous reptiles of Asia
Fossils of China
Prehistoric pseudosuchian genera
Fossil taxa described in 2022